E.M. Hager & Sons Company Building is a historic planing mill located in downtown Buffalo, Erie County, New York. The main section was built in 1878 and is a three-story brick building.  Two-story additions were made to the main block about 1880, and a three-story wing about 1920.  It features brick corbelling and segmental arched openings.  E.M. Hager & Sons Company remained in operation until the 1980s, after which the building was converted to a restaurant (the Spaghetti Warehouse) and night club.

It was listed on the National Register of Historic Places in 2013.

References

Industrial buildings and structures on the National Register of Historic Places in New York (state)
Industrial buildings completed in 1878
Buildings and structures in Buffalo, New York
National Register of Historic Places in Buffalo, New York
1878 establishments in New York (state)